The 1947 Illinois Fighting Illini football team was an American football team that represented the University of Illinois during the 1947 Big Nine Conference football season.  In their sixth year under head coach Ray Eliot, the Illini compiled a 5–3–1 record and finished in a three-way tie for third place in the Big Ten Conference.  The team played No. 5 Army to a scoreless tie and narrowly lost by a 14–7 score to undefeated national champion Michigan. End Ike Owens was selected as the team's most valuable player.

Schedule

References

Illinois
Illinois Fighting Illini football seasons
Illinois Fighting Illini football